IKK-β also known as  inhibitor of nuclear factor kappa-B kinase subunithhv xlh  thfbeta is a protein that in humans is encoded by the IKBKB (inhibitor of kappa light polypeptide gene enhancer in B-cells, kinase beta) gene.

Function 

IKK-β is an enzyme that serves as a protein subunit of IκB kinase,  which is a component of the cytokine-activated intracellular signaling pathway involved in triggering immune responses. IKK's activity causes activation of a transcription factor known as Nuclear Transcription factor kappa-B or NF-κB.  Activated IKK-β phosphorylates a protein called the inhibitor of NF-κB, IκB (IκBα), which binds NF-κB to inhibit its function. Phosphorylated IκB is degraded via the ubiquitination pathway, freeing NF-κB, and allowing its entry into the nucleus of the cell where it activates various genes involved in inflammation and other immune responses.

Clinical significance 

IKK-β plays a significant role in brain cells following a stroke. If NF-κB activation by IKK-β is blocked, damaged cells within the brain stay alive, and according to a study performed by the University of Heidelberg and the University of Ulm, the cells even appear to make some recovery.

Inhibition of IKK and IKK-related kinases has been investigated as a therapeutic option for the treatment of inflammatory diseases and cancer. The small-molecule inhibitor of IKK2 SAR113945, developed by Sanofi-Aventis, was evaluated in patients with knee osteoarthritis.

Model organisms
Model organisms have been used in the study of IKK-β function. The size of an infarct, or tissue killed or damaged by ischemia, is reduced in mice in which IKK-β has been blocked. Additionally, experimental mice with an overactive form of IKK-β experience loss of many more neurons than normal mice after a stroke-simulating event.  Researchers found a molecule that could block the signaling of IKK-β for up to four and a half hours. In another study, researchers found that inhibiting IKK-β prevented kidney and wasting diseases in an animal model used to study wasting diseases of human AIDS sufferers.

A conditional knockout mouse line, called Ikbkbtm1a(EUCOMM)Wtsi was generated as part of the International Knockout Mouse Consortium program — a high-throughput mutagenesis project to generate and distribute animal models of disease to interested scientists — at the Wellcome Trust Sanger Institute.

Male and female animals underwent a standardized phenotypic screen to determine the effects of deletion. Twenty six tests were carried out and two phenotypes were reported. A reduced number of homozygous mutant embryos were identified during gestation, and none survived until weaning. The remaining tests were carried out on heterozygous mutant adult mice, and no significant abnormalities were observed in these animals.

Interactions 

IKK-β (IKBKB) has been shown to interact with 

 HDAC9,
 CDC37,
 CHUK
 CTNNB1,
 FANCA,
 IKBKG
 IRAK1,
 NFKBIA,
 MAP3K14,
 NFKB1,
 NFKBIB,
 NCOA3,
 PPM1B,
 TNFRSF1A, and
 TRAF2.

References

See also 
 IκB kinase

Molecular neuroscience
Programmed cell death
Genes mutated in mice
EC 2.7.11